Cristina Olvera Barrios (born 24 July 1953) is a Mexican politician affiliated with the PANAL. As of 2013 she served as Deputy of the LXII Legislature of the Mexican Congress representing the Federal District.

References

1953 births
Living people
Politicians from Sonora
Women members of the Chamber of Deputies (Mexico)
New Alliance Party (Mexico) politicians
21st-century Mexican politicians
21st-century Mexican women politicians
Deputies of the LXII Legislature of Mexico
Members of the Chamber of Deputies (Mexico) for Mexico City